KFAI (90.3 FM Minneapolis) is a community radio station in Minnesota.  The station broadcasts a wide variety of music, and also airs programming catering to many of the diverse ethnic groups of the region.  KFAI has frequently been honored by local media critics for its shows and musical diversity (for instance, the local alternative weekly City Pages has frequently included it in the annual "Best of the Twin Cities" awards).

The station offers public access services, so they encourage anyone in the community to make their own show and have it broadcast over the air.  The station is part of Minnesota's AMPERS network and, since it covers the largest population, is considered by many to be the group's flagship station.  The call sign stands for Fresh Air, Inc., the non-profit organization that owns KFAI.

KFAI's studios are located on Riverside Avenue in Minneapolis, while its transmitter is located atop the IDS Center in downtown Minneapolis.

History

The station first went on the air with a 10-watt signal on May 1, 1978, after drawn-out deliberations with the Federal Communications Commission, which was licensing a few low-power FM stations at the time.  The first home was in the belfry of the Walker Community Church in South Minneapolis.  In 1984, the primary transmitter was moved from the roof of the Seward Co-op to the top of the Foshay Tower in downtown Minneapolis and upgraded to 125 watts.  The studios moved from the church two years later, when it moved to the second floor of a Butler Drug store on Lake Street.  In 1991, studios were built especially for Fresh Air Radio at Cedar-Riverside near the University of Minnesota, where it remains today.  A 170-watt West St. Paul translator station went up in 1994 and was sold to Hmong Radio Broadcast, LLC in May 2020.

In March 2007, KFAI's main transmitter moved to IDS Center, after the new owner of Foshay Tower evicted all current tenants of the building as part of a redevelopment plan to turn it into a hotel . Since November 6, 2007, the station has been operating under an FCC Construction Permit with an upgraded effective radiated power of 900 Watts and an IDS Center tower height of 247 meters (811 feet) above ground level.  This upgrade allows the station to have a stronger signal from the IDS Center which extends the station's coverage deeper into St. Paul and the southeast suburbs.

Due to KFAI's limited signal power, programming is targeted to the Twin Cities communities. Three other IPR stations exist in Minneapolis-St. Paul: KBEM-FM (jazz), KMOJ (urban), and KUOM (college/eclectic). KVSC, another college station in St. Cloud, Minnesota, can also be received by some area residents.  The station had major plans for expansion into HD radio by the end of 2008.  As part of this expansion, on November 16, 2008, the station switched over to a new 900-watt transmitter and directional antenna for its 90.3 FM signal, significantly increasing the broadcast coverage area.

In mid-2010, KFAI changed its weekday programming schedule to institute an all-news format from 6-10 a.m. The change included the scheduling of The Takeaway, a three-hour syndicated show from Public Radio International (PRI). Some long-time listeners and programmers were upset with the change, charging the station with abandoning its volunteer programming model. The Takeaway was  dropped two years later, after PRI announced the decision to reduce it to a one-hour show.

Programming

KFAI's programming is highly eclectic and uses block programming, so that, for example, one might find a country music program followed by an hour of news about LGBT issues, or a reggae program followed by an hour of spoken word readings or an hour of Hmong programming. Although programs almost always occupy the same blocks from week to week, programs often have little or nothing to do with what precedes or follows them.

Some of the station's programming is carried on other radio stations. The show Crap from the Past, by Ron Gerber, airs on several stations in Arizona, plus one in New Zealand (in addition to a few Internet radio streams). KFAI offers archives of locally produced shows, and many of the station's various hosts and programmers also offer their own archived broadcasts at other sources.

Notable personalities 
Barb Abney 
 Dale Connelly
 Charlie Parr
 Mark Wheat

See also
List of community radio stations in the United States

References

External links
KFAI official website

Sound Affects: audio theater
Shockwave Radio Theater Podcasts
Crap From the Past archives
KFAI's page on StylusCity
Higher than Fi

Radio stations in Minneapolis–Saint Paul
Independent Public Radio
Community radio stations in the United States
Radio stations established in 1978
1978 establishments in Minnesota